Ubaldo Lay (14 April 1917 - 27 September 1984) was an Italian actor and voice actor.

Life and career 
Born in Rome as Ubaldo Bussa, after graduating in law, Lay was admitted to the Academy of Dramatic Arts in 1939, from which he graduated with honors.  He debuted on stage in 1945 and on films in 1946. Active on radio, in 1951 Lay moved to New York City where he hosted several radio programs for Italo-Americans audiences. Back in Italy, he resumed his radio and stage activities and debuted in television in 1956.

Lay's breakout role was Lieutenant Sheridan, that he played in five RAI crime series and in several television films. He also starred in several other successful television series, often directed by Anton Giulio Majano, while his cinema activity was less significant, consisting mainly of supporting roles. Lay died of a cerebral hemorrhage aged 67.

Partial filmography
 Monte Cassino (1946) - Don Eusebio
 Hey Boy (1948) - Don Pietro (voice, uncredited)
 Toto the Sheik (1950) - Il maggiore della legione
 The Merry Widower (1950) - Shaphiro
 Solo per te Lucia (1952)
 I tre corsari (1952) - Il carceriere Alvaro
 Guilt Is Not Mine (1952) - Andrea
 Jolanda, the Daughter of the Black Corsair (1953)
 Captain Phantom (1953) - (uncredited)
 A Day in Court (1954) - Il fidanzato di Anna 
 Naples Is Always Naples (1954) - Il tunisino
 Toto in Hell (1955) - Belfagor
 Chéri-Bibi (1955) - Conte Ponte-Marie
 The Violent Patriot (1956) - Stefano, padre di Anna
 Il canto dell'emigrante (1956) - Capo banditi
 Terrore sulla città (1957)
 The Pirate and the Slave Girl (1959) - Tripolino
 Chiamate 22-22 tenente Sheridan (1960) - Tenente Ezzy Sheridan
 Gerarchi si muore (1961) - Giuseppe, the butler
 Son of the Circus (1963) - Avv. Adami
 Provaci anche tu, Lionel (1973) - Sheridan
 The Exorcist: Italian Style (1975) - Lt. Sheridan (final film role)

References

External links 

1917 births
Male actors from Rome
Italian male stage actors
Italian male film actors
Italian male television actors
1984 deaths
Accademia Nazionale di Arte Drammatica Silvio D'Amico alumni
20th-century Italian male actors